Zvonko Šuvak (born August 29, 1958 in Jesenice, Yugoslavia) is a retired Slovenian professional ice hockey player.

Career

Club career
Šuvak began his career in the Yugoslav Ice Hockey League with HK Kranjska Gora in 1976. The following year, he joined HK Acroni Jesenice. Šuvak is the all-time leading scorer of the Yugoslav Ice Hockey League, with 520 goals and 314 assists.

International career
He represented Yugoslavia at nine IIHF World Championships, and the Winter Olympics in 1984. In 155 games, Šuvak scored 129 goals and 73 assists.

References

1958 births
Living people
HK Acroni Jesenice players
Ice hockey players at the 1984 Winter Olympics
Olympic ice hockey players of Yugoslavia
Sportspeople from Jesenice, Jesenice
Slovenian ice hockey left wingers
Yugoslav ice hockey left wingers